Ephrem Mtsire or Ephraim the Lesser (died c. 1101/3) was a Georgian monk at Antioch, theologian and translator of patristic literature from Greek.

Information as to Ephrem’s life is scarce. Early in life he received a thorough Hellenic education presumably in Constantinople, where his purported father Vache Karich'isdze, a Georgian nobleman from Tao, had removed in 1027. Ephrem then became a monk at the Black Mountain near Antioch, which was populated by a vibrant Georgian monastic community of around 70 monks. Later in his life, c. 1091, Ephrem became a hegumen of the Kastana monastery, probably at the Castalia spring in Daphne, outside Antioch.

Ephrem’s hellenophile translational technique proved to be fundamental for later Georgian literature. He was the first to introduce literal rendering into Georgian, and made scholia and lexica familiar to Georgian readers. Some of his notable translations are the works by Pseudo-Dionysius the Areopagite, Basil of Caesarea, Ephrem the Syrian, and John of Damascus. Ephrem’s original work "Tale on the Reason for the Conversion of the Georgians" (უწყებაჲ მიზეზსა ქართველთა მოქცევისასა; uts’qebay mizezsa k’art’velt’a mok’tsevisasa) is yet another manifesto in defense of autocephaly of the Georgian Orthodox Church which was subject of a dispute between the Georgian and Antiochian churchmen in the 11th century.

References

External links 

 ღირსი ეფრემ მცირე, ფილოსოფოსი (+1101). Orthodoxy.ge

11th-century births
1100s deaths
Philosophers from Georgia (country)
Saints of Georgia (country)
Writers from Georgia (country)
Translators from Georgia (country)
Christian monks from Georgia (country)
11th-century Christian saints